Guéréda is a town in the Wadi Fira Region, Chad.

Guéréda was the site of fighting between the Chadian army and the Rally of Democratic Forces (RAFD) in early December 2006. On December 1, eleven people were killed and 82 injured in the fighting. Seventeen expatriate humanitarian staff are located in Guéréda near the large refugee camps at Mile and Kounoungo, where 30,000 Sudanese refugees from the Darfur conflict are located.

The town is served by Guéréda Airport.

Wadi Fira Region
Populated places in Chad